The 2007 Supercoppa Italiana was a match contested by 2006–07 Serie A winners Internazionale and 2006–07 Coppa Italia winners Roma.

The match took place on 19 August 2007 in San Siro, Milan, and resulted in a 1–0 victory for Roma. The goal was scored by Daniele De Rossi thanks to a penalty provoked by a foul of Nicolás Burdisso on Francesco Totti.

Match details

References

2007
Supercoppa 2007
Supercoppa 2007
Supercoppa Italiana
August 2007 sports events in Europe